"Sting Me" is a song by American rock band the Black Crowes. It is the opening track on the band's second studio album, The Southern Harmony and Musical Companion, and was released in 1992 as its second commercial single. The song reached number one on the US Billboard Album Rock Tracks chart, where it remained for two weeks, and was the second of four singles from the album to top the Album Rock chart. A music video was also filmed for the song, featuring the band performing at a marijuana legalization rally.

Track listings

UK CD1
 "Sting Me"
 "Jealous Again" (live)
 "Seeing Things" (live)
 "Boomers Story" (live)

UK CD2
 "Sting Me"
 "She Talks to Angels" (live)
 "Thorn in My Pride" (live)
 "Darling of the Underground Press" (live)

UK 7-inch and cassette single
 "Sting Me"
 "Rainy Day Women (No. 12 & 35)"

Australian CD single
 "Sting Me"
 "Rainy Day Women (No. 12 & 35)"
 "Twice As Hard" (remix)
 "Jealous Guy" (live)

Japanese CD single
 "Sting Me"
 "Rainy Day Women (No. 12 & 35)"
 "She Talks to Angels" (live)
 "Boomers Story" (live)

Charts

Release history

References

1992 singles
1992 songs
American Recordings (record label) singles
The Black Crowes songs
Songs written by Chris Robinson (singer)
Songs written by Rich Robinson